Aneeq Hassan (born 22 July 1991) is an English-born  first-class cricketer. He made his first-class debut for Lankan Cricket Club in Tier B of the 2016–17 Premier League Tournament on 9 December 2016.

References

External links
 

1991 births
Living people
Sri Lankan cricketers
Lankan Cricket Club cricketers
People from Blackburn